Desert View High School  is a public high school located in southern Tucson, Arizona approximately 1 mile west of I-10 and Valencia Road.

History
Desert View High School opened in 1987 with 9th, 10th, 11th and 12th grade classes.

See also
 Sunnyside High School

References

Schools in Tucson, Arizona
Educational institutions established in 1987
Public high schools in Arizona
1987 establishments in Arizona